Semiha Yıldırım (born 1954) is a Turkish retired teacher who was the second lady of Turkey as the wife of former Turkish prime minister Binali Yıldırım. The "Semiha Yıldırım Primary School" in Çekmeköy, which was made by her children and commissioned by the Ministry of Education, is named in her honor.

Life 
Semiha Yıldırım was born in 1954 in Kayı Village of Refahiye district in Erzincan. After finishing her primary and secondary education, she entered the school for teachers and after completing her education there, she graduated in 1972 and started her career as a teacher. The first place in which she started teaching was the Refahiye district in Erzincan, her hometown. Yıldırım continued teaching until 1993, and after serving in various cities across Turkey retired in 1993. After her retirement, she continued her mission in voluntary education projects. A primary school in Istanbul is named after her.

Personal life 
She is married to Turkey's 27th Prime Minister Binali Yıldırım, with whom she has three children: Erkan Yıldırım, Ahmet Yıldırım and Büşra Yıldırım. She is a devouted Muslim and has stated: "Islam should conquer everywhere".

Awards 
2012 - "Mother of the Year", İzmir Education Volunteers Association

References 

Turkish schoolteachers
People from Refahiye
1954 births
Living people